A standard, also called a pizaine, was a collar of mail often worn with plate armour.

Construction
The standard protected the throat and neck and usually extended over the shoulders; it was in use from the 14th to the 16th century. Unlike the similar aventail, it was not attached to a helmet. It was called a standard because the part encircling the neck and throat was able to stand upright without any external stiffening. This part of the standard was composed of links joined 6-in-1, which made it less flexible and also stronger; the usual, more flexible, ratio of mail linking was 4-in-1. The lower, shoulder-covering, part of the standard was of 4-in-1 linked mail. Some standards were decorated with edging in brass or bronze links (sometimes gilded), and/or were given a zig-zag lower edge (vandyked).

Use
Standards were sometimes worn under an aventail, or even a gorget, for extra protection. However, standards were often worn without other neck protection by soldiers who valued an unencumbered facility to move the head over additional protection. Standards were popular with archers, whose mobility was at a premium. Standards were frequently worn with helmets that did not afford integral neck and throat protection, such as the sallet, barbute, and kettle hat.

References

Bibliography
Blair, C. (1959) European Armour: circa 1066 to circa 1700, The Macmillan Company, New York
Loades, M. (2013) The Longbow, Bloomsbury Publishing 
Way, A. (1862) Original Documents The Armour and Arms Belonging to Henry Bowet, Archbishop of York, Deceased in 1423, from the Roll of his Executors’ Accounts, Archaeological Journal, 19:1, 159-165, DOI:10.1080/00665983.1862.10851226

Medieval armour
Body armor
Neckwear